James Scott Munn (born May 21, 1970 in Littleton, Colorado) is an American rower.

References 
 
 

1970 births
Living people
American male rowers
Sportspeople from Littleton, Colorado
Olympic rowers of the United States
Rowers at the 1992 Summer Olympics
World Rowing Championships medalists for the United States